The 2002–03 Euroleague was the third season of the professional basketball  competition for elite clubs throughout Europe, organised by Euroleague Basketball Company, and it was the 46th season of the premier competition for European men's clubs overall. The 2002–03 season featured 24 competing teams from 13 countries. The final of the competition was held in Palau Sant Jordi, Barcelona, Spain, with hosts FC Barcelona defeating Benetton Treviso 76-65.

Regular season
The first phase was a regular season, in which the competing teams were drawn into three groups, each containing eight teams. Each team played every other team in its group at home and away, resulting in 14 games for each team in the first stage. The top 5 teams in each group and the best sixth-placed team advanced to the next round. The complete list of tiebreakers was provided in the lead-in to the Regular Season results.

If one or more clubs were level on won-lost record, tiebreakers were applied in the following order:
Head-to-head record in matches between the tied clubs
Overall point difference in games between the tied clubs
Overall point difference in all group matches (first tiebreaker if tied clubs were not in the same group)
Points scored in all group matches
Sum of quotients of points scored and points allowed in each group match

Group A

Group B

Group C

Top 16
The surviving teams were divided into four groups of four teams each, and again a round robin system was adopted, resulting in 6 games each, with the top team advancing to the Final Four. Tiebreakers were identical to those used in the Regular Season.

Group D

Group E

Group F

Group G

Final four

The Final Four was played from 9 May until 11 May 2003 and was held in the Palau Sant Jordi in Barcelona.

Awards

Top Scorer

Regular Season MVP

Top 16 MVP

Final Four MVP

Finals Top Scorer

All-Euroleague First Team

All-Euroleague Second Team

External links
 Euroleague.net - Official Euroleague homepage.
 Eurobasket.com - Popular basketball news site.
 TalkBasket.net - Basketball forum.

 
EuroLeague seasons